The 2005 European Canoe Slalom Championships took place at the Tacen Whitewater Course in Tacen, Slovenia between 24 and 26 June 2005 under the auspices of the European Canoe Association (ECA). It was the 6th edition.

Medal summary

Men's results

Canoe

Kayak

Women's results

Kayak

Medal table

References
 Official results
 European Canoe Association

European Canoe Slalom Championships
European Canoe Slalom Championships
European Canoe Slalom Championships
Sport in Ljubljana
Canoeing in Slovenia